Ruari MacLennan (born 26 March 1988) is a Scottish football midfielder who plays for Armadale.. MacLennan is a product of Clyde's youth system.

Career
Born in Livingston, MacLennan signed a YTS contract with Clyde in the summer of 2006, and made his début on the opening day of that season, coming on as a substitute in a 0–0 draw against St Johnstone. He was given a three-year professional contract in June 2007.

MacLennan hit another milestone against St Johnstone the following season, when he scored his first senior goal in a 1–0 victory in August 2007. He notched his second goal for Clyde in the Scottish Challenge Cup, in a defeat at home to Dunfermline Athletic. His other notable goals include the late equalizer against Greenock Morton in the 2–1 away victory in which Clyde scored two injury time goals to seal a very important league victory at Cappielow, and a double in a 3–2 victory over Livingston in April 2008. MacLennan was shown his first senior red card in a Scottish First Division defeat away to Livingston, where he was judged to have committed a professional foul.

He is the older brother of footballer Roddy MacLennan. In a Scottish Cup tie against Montrose in November 2007, the MacLennans became the first brothers to play for Clyde for 17 years. MacLennan's contract was terminated in June 2009, following Clyde's relegation and financial troubles.

On 24 November 2010, MacLennan was given the go ahead to resume playing football after hip surgery and joined his local Junior club, Linlithgow Rose. Alongside his brother Roddy, MacLennan moved on to Bo'ness United in July 2016. However, after just a year return home to Linlithgow in the summer of 2017 along with his brother and Strickland 

MacLennan signed for Armadale in 2021.

Statistics
Correct as of 16 January 2009

See also
Clyde F.C. season 2006-07 | 2007–08 | 2008–09

References

External links

Living people
1988 births
Scottish footballers
Clyde F.C. players
Scottish Football League players
Sportspeople from Livingston, West Lothian
Linlithgow Rose F.C. players
Bo'ness United F.C. players
Armadale Thistle F.C. players
Scottish Junior Football Association players
Association football midfielders
Footballers from West Lothian